XXXenophile is a collectible card game based on the XXXenophile comic book, and was published by Slag-Blah Entertainment in 1996.

Gameplay
XXXenophile is a mature-themed collectible science fiction/fantasy card game.

Publication history
A collectible card game based on the XXXenophile comic was created, with game mechanics designed by James Ernest;
it was the first adult-themed CCG (with adult mechanics—some cards contained directions for the player to remove a piece of clothing). It was designed after positive reader reaction to the tenth issue of the comic's cover, which showed cards for a hypothetical XXXenophile CCG.

In 2001 this game was reworked into a non-adult, non-collectible card game called Girl Genius: The Works, based on the Foglios' comic Girl Genius.

Reviews
InQuest #17

Further reading

References

External links
 

Card games introduced in 1996
Collectible card games